Saskatoon Public Schools (SPS) or Saskatoon S.D. No. 13 is the largest school division in Saskatchewan serving approximately 24,000 students.

Saskatoon Public Schools operates 49 elementary schools, 10 secondary schools and 3 associate or affiliate schools in Saskatoon and surrounding area. The offices of the Saskatoon School Board are housed in the Eaton's Building.  Saskatoon School Division No. 13 belongs to Department of Saskatchewan Learning Division 4 along with Englefeld Protestant Separate S.D. No. 132, Horizon School Division No. 205, Prairie Spirit School Division No. 206  St. Pauls R.C.S.S.D No. 20, Sun West School Division No. 207 and Division scolaire francophone 310.

Elementary schools

 École Alvin Buckwold School
 Brevoort Park School
 Brownell School
 Brunskill School
 Buena Vista School
 Caroline Robins Community School
 Caswell Community School
 Chief Whitecap School
 City Park School
 Colette Bourgonje School
 École College Park School
 Dr. John G. Egnatoff School
 Dundonald School
 Ernest Lindner School
 Fairhaven School
 École Forest Grove School
 Greystone Heights School
 École Henry Kelsey School
 Holliston School
 Howard Coad School
 Hugh Cairns V.C. School
 James L. Alexander School
 John Dolan School
 John Lake School
 King George Community School
 Lakeridge School
Online Learning Elementary
 École Lakeview School
 Lawson Heights School
 Lester B. Pearson School
 Mayfair Community School
 Montgomery School
 North Park Wilson School
 Pleasant Hill Community School
 Prince Philip School
 Princess Alexandra Community School
 Queen Elizabeth School
 École River Heights School
 Roland Michener School
 Silverspring School
 Silverwood Heights School
 Sutherland School
 Sylvia Fedoruk School
 École Victoria School
 Vincent Massey Community School
 W.P. Bate Community School
 Wâhkôhtowin School
 Westmount Community School
 Wildwood School
 Willowgrove School

High schools

 Aden Bowman Collegiate
 Bedford Road Collegiate
 Centennial Collegiate
 Evan Hardy Collegiate
 Marion M. Graham Collegiate
 Mount Royal Collegiate
 Nutana Collegiate
Online Learning Secondary
 Royal West Campus
 Tommy Douglas Collegiate
 Walter Murray Collegiate

Associate & alliance schools
 Saskatoon Misbah School (K-9)
 Charles Red Hawk Elementary School (Pre K-6)
 Royal West Campus (young adult learning) - houses continuing education classes. Started by SPS in 2002 as a pilot project, located in the former Estey School in Mount Royal.

Defunct schools

 Alexandra School – demolished in 1984; name taken by the newer Princess School to become Princess Alexandra School.
 Albert School – closed in 1978; now the Albert Community Centre.
 Churchill School – closed in 1985 after less than 30 years in operation; the building became the Saskatoon Full Gospel Church (SFGC). Demolished to make way for a condominium development in 2012.  
 Estey School – closed in 1984; utilized for storage and other administrative uses until 2002 when it reopened as the SPS affiliate Royal West Campus, offering education courses for young adults. 
 Grosvenor Park School – closed in 1993; now the Saskatoon Islamic Centre and home to the Saskatoon Misbah School. 
 Lorne Haselton School – opened in 1961 but closed in the mid-1980s; now the Saskatchewan Abilities Council.
 Princess School – demolished in 1961; replaced by a newer Princess (later Princess Alexandra) School.
 Richmond Heights School – closed in the mid-1980s; now the Park Heights Seniors Centre
 Thornton School – demolished in 1997; replaced by a townhouse development.
 original Victoria School – dismantled, moved from its original location on Broadway Avenue and 12th Street and rebuilt on the University of Saskatchewan campus in 1911.
 second Victoria School - also located at Broadway and 12th, but demolished after the third (current) Victoria School was built and the original was relocated to the university grounds.
 Wilson School – closed in 1993 and amalgamated with North Park School to become North Park Wilson School; later becoming the First Nations University of Canada (FNUC) in Saskatoon. In 2011, FNUC sold the building to Affinity Credit Union who is currently converting it to an office.
 McNab Park School (formerly Air Marshall Curtis School) – closed in the early 1980s and demolished soon after. After sitting as a vacant lot for decades, the site is now part of a new hotel and business district being developed near the airport.
 King Edward School – Originally built in 1904 in the downtown where it doubled as City Hall until demolition in 1956; a replacement school in City Park, adjacent to Kinsmen Park, operated until 1980 when it closed after a fire. The building was demolished and was replaced by King Edward Place, a low-cost housing development.
 Riverview Collegiate Institute, formerly Saskatoon Technical Collegiate for quick entry into the workplace, including learning trades. It was built in 1931 along the riverbank in the Central Business District. This high school also housed the Saskatoon Public School Board administrative offices and was called the Gathercole Centre. The school was decommissioned in the 1990s and the school board relocated its offices to the Eaton's Building in the 2000s. After a brief stint as a filming location, the building was demolished in the late 2000s to make way for the city's River Landing redevelopment. As of 2019 the ALT Hotel now stands where Riverview/Gathercole Centre used to be.

References

External links
 Saskatoon Public Schools

School divisions in Saskatchewan
Education in Saskatoon